Sorry, I Didn't Know is a British panel show broadcast on ITV, in which panelists answer questions about Black history. A pilot aired on ITV2 in 2016 and the first series of four episodes aired in October 2020, as part of Black History Month. The programme is hosted by Jimmy Akingbola and has team captains Chizzy Akudolu and Judi Love. A second series of five episodes began in October 2021. A third series premiered on 2 October 2022, with Akingbola, Akudolu, and new team captain Eddie Kadi.

Format
The host Jimmy Akingbola asks two teams questions relating to Black history. Rounds variously show panelists attempting to finish a famous quote, work out the name of a Black person from yes/no questions, identify whether a fact presented by the other team is true or false, work out who invented particular technologies and when or match descriptions of people to their faces. In the final round, "General 'Tupidness", panelists buzz in to answer trivia questions about Black figures. Different round structures were used in the 2016 pilot.

Akingbola commented that the show inverts the norm of comedy panel shows which have white men as team captains and women or BAME people as "token" panelists.

Production
The series was created by Fraser Ayres and Minnie Ayres. The presenter Jimmy Akingbola served as producer. Akingbola found presenting to be "fun and yet surreal"—his previous background was in acting. The programme is produced by Triforce Productions, which Akingbola and Fraser Ayres co-founded. In October 2016, it was announced that ITV commissioned a pilot, along with three other programmes featuring BAME comedians, to be aired in the run-up to the November 2016 MOBO Awards, which recognise excellence in black music. The pilot aired on ITV2 on 3 November 2016 at 8:30p.m. to an estimated 157,000 viewers.

In May 2020, Akingbola commented on Twitter that the show had been rejected by ITV, the BBC, Channel 4, Channel 5 and Sky UK and that the production company was now looking to get the show commissioned in the United States. In July 2020, he told Radio Times that the rejections were sometimes without comment and sometimes described the show as "a bit niche".

The show was one of four shows commissioned for ITV as part of the 2020 Black History Month, celebrated in October in the United Kingdom. The others were Alison Hammond: Back To School, Craig & Danny: Funny, Black and on TV and IRL with Team Charlene. ITV additionally ran documentaries and other programmes relating to Black History Month, and a series of "It's all about" idents made by Black artists. It was Triforce Productions's first primetime programme and the first directing credit for Jan Genesis. The first series ran for four episodes.

The show's commissioning followed a resurgence of the Black Lives Matter movement after the May 2020 murder of George Floyd. Akingbola said that he did not think audiences had changed substantially since the pilot in 2016, only that "the need to serve them properly has increased exponentially" as the Black Lives Matter movement brought "a spotlight to the lack of inclusion". He criticized the pigeonholing of the programme as a "black show", aiming to disprove that "that black content does not appeal to mainstream audiences". Akingbola said that he hoped to see "non-tokenised shows throughout the year" in future. He said that the crew would "love to have the opportunity" to be renewed for a second series and that the programme "wasn't made just for October".

In June 2021, ITV announced that it had renewed the series for another five episodes, which aired the same October.

A third series of five episodes was filmed at the Riverside Studios in Hammersmith in June 2022, to be broadcast in October of the same year. Jimmy Akingbola and team captain Chizzy Akudolu return, although it is unknown if Judi Love is part of the latest series. Guests include White Yardie, Shaun Wallace, Russell Kane and Verona Rose.

Episodes

Pilot (2016)
The pilot was presented by Jimmy Akingbola, with team captains Chizzy Akudolu and Jo Martin. It aired on ITV2 in the timeslot of 8:30p.m. on Thursday under the title I'm Sorry, I Didn't Know.

Series 1 (2020)
The first series of four episodes premiered during Black History Month. It aired on ITV on Tuesdays at 10:45p.m. The host was Jimmy Akingbola and Chizzy Akudolu and Judi Love served as team captains.

Series 2 (2021)
As with the first series, the second aired on ITV during Black History Month with Akingbola as presenter and Akudolu and Love as team captains. It was moved to the timeslot of 10:20p.m. on Sunday.

Series 3 (2022)
The third series will air during Black History Month with Akingbola as presenter and Akudolu and Kadi as team captains.

Reception
Steve Bennett reviewed the 2016 pilot positively, praising that Akingbola has an "innate authority" and the panelists "deliver as dependably and flippantly as any of the big panel shows". He described the questions as "at the smart end of the spectrum" for panel shows and found the programme "informative". Following the pilot, the programme was nominated for a 2017 Creative Diversity Network Award for Outstanding Entertainment Programme; the judges called it "distinctive" and "bold", praising it for "breaking open general assumptions around casting as well as content", though the award was given to The Last Leg.

References

External links
 
 
 

2016 British television series debuts
2010s British comedy television series
2020s British comedy television series
2010s British game shows
2020s British game shows
British panel games
English-language television shows
ITV panel games